The Growly Family is an album released in 1998 by psychedelic trance artists G.M.S.

Track listing
 "Surreal Killer (The Doppelganger Remix)" – 8:09
 "The Caterpillar" – 6:57
 "The Growly Family" – 6:50
 "Tentacles of a Jelly Fish" – 7:37
 "Mouth of Madness" – 7:10
 "Addiction" – 8:09
 "Slow Motion" – 6:50
 "Gwai" – 6:53
 "Dirty Harry" – 7:35
 "Yashu" – 7:10

The album was released on CD and triple-LP.  The same tracks are included on both formats, but the ordering is slightly different.

1998 albums
GMS (music group) albums